Khoshkabad may refer to:
 Khoshkabad, Fars
 Khoshkabad, Hormozgan
 Khoshkabad, Isfahan
 Khoshkabad, Yazd